Kidero is a rural locality (a selo) in Tsuntinsky District of the Republic of Dagestan, Russia. Population: 

Between 1991 and 2017 Kidero served as the administrative center of Tsuntinsky District, however, it lacks the necessary infrastructure. In 2017, the district center was moved into the selo of Tsunta.

References

Notes

Sources

Rural localities in Tsuntinsky District